Jewell is an unincorporated community in northern Richland Township, Defiance County, Ohio, United States. It has a post office with the ZIP code 43530. It is located at the intersection of County Roads 55 and 185, a short distance southeast of U.S. Route 24.

References

Unincorporated communities in Ohio
Unincorporated communities in Defiance County, Ohio